Parcel may refer to:

 Parcels (band), an Australian modern soul band
 Parcel (consignment), an individual consignment of cargo for shipment
 Parcel (film), 2019 Bengali film 
 Parcel (package), sent through the mail or package delivery
 Fluid parcel, a concept in fluid dynamics
 Land lot, a piece of land
 Placer (geography), parcel in Portuguese, a type of submerged bank or reef
 an object used in the game Pass the parcel